is a 2012 Japanese legal comedy-drama film, directed by Takashi Miike and based on the Capcom video game Phoenix Wright: Ace Attorney. The film stars Hiroki Narimiya, Mirei Kiritani, and Takumi Saitoh. In the film, rookie defense attorney Phoenix Wright takes on a series of court cases, culminating in one that pits him against Manfred von Karma, a prosecutor who has remained undefeated throughout his forty-year career.

It made its premiere at the International Film Festival Rotterdam on 1 February 2012 and was released in Japanese cinemas on 11 February 2012. The US premiere was made at the Hawaii International Film Festival in April 2012. Miike has stated there are plans for an international release with both dubbing and subtitles available for each specific region.

Plot
The court system, overburdened by the massive number of crimes being committed, introduces a radical new method for settling cases more quickly: the bench trial system. Both prosecution and defense face each other in open court and have three days to make their case before the judge renders a verdict.

Phoenix Wright, a rookie defense attorney, has just won his first case: Defending his friend Larry Butz from a false charge of murder with assistance from his mentor, veteran attorney Mia Fey. Butz gives Mia a statue of The Thinker as thanks. Wright is then thrust into another major case when Mia is bludgeoned to death in her office with the statue, and her younger sister Maya, a spirit medium, is accused of it based on a dying note from Mia. Facing off against his childhood friend Miles Edgeworth, Wright manages to prove that Mia was murdered by photojournalist Redd White, and Maya is declared not guilty. After the case, Wright reveals to Maya, who gets hired as his assistant, that he decided to become an attorney after a childhood incident where he was accused of stealing money and Miles and Butz defended him.

Soon after, Wright learns that Miles has been arrested for the murder of attorney Robert Hammond. Wright convinces Miles to accept him as his defense attorney and learns that he will be facing off against Miles's mentor, Manfred von Karma, a vicious prosecutor with a perfect record. Despite von Karma's underhanded tactics, Wright is able to deduce that Hammond was actually murdered by Yanni Yogi. Yogi was involved fifteen years prior in the "DL-6" case, concerning the death of Gregory Edgeworth, Miles's father, who was shot dead in the courtroom's evidence storage. Yogi, then a court bailiff, was accused of the murder after he discovered Gregory allegedly tampering with a gun listed as evidence in a case against von Karma. Hammond coerced him into pleading not guilty by reason of insanity, and he was released. The case destroyed Yogi's life, causing his wife to commit suicide and leaving him a broken old man. He claims to have received a package with a gun urging him to take revenge on Hammond and Miles. After Yogi's confession, Miles claims that he murdered his father, sparking a new investigation into the DL-6 case.

Wright proves that Miles is innocent of his father's murder and uncovers evidence that von Karma was the one who murdered Gregory after having committed perjury. However, he cannot prove it as the gun Gregory was believed to have tampered with and was killed with has gone missing. While thinking of a plan, Wright accidentally breaks the Thinker statue, finding hidden notes written by Mia on the DL-6 case and a bag with the bullet that killed Gregory, revealed to be the reason why she was killed. These pieces of evidence are used to incriminate von Karma, who suffers a nervous breakdown in court and is arrested for murder and conspiracy, resulting in the judge acquitting Miles of all charges.

Wright swears to help clear Yogi's name, and he and Miles reconcile. Butz later reveals that he was the one who stole the money that Wright was accused of stealing when they were children. Maya takes a leave of absence so she can return home for further training as a medium, while Miles and Wright continue their careers as prosecutor and defense attorney, but this time as friendly rivals rather than enemies.

Cast

 Hiroki Narimiya as Phoenix Wright / Ryūichi Naruhodō
 Mirei Kiritani as Maya Fey / Mayoi Ayasato
 Takumi Saitoh as Miles Edgeworth / Reiji Mitsurugi
 Rei Dan as Mia Fey / Chihiro Ayasato
 Minami Hamabe as young Mia Fey / Chihiro Ayasato
 Shunsuke Daitō as Dick Gumshoe / Keisuke Itonokogiri
 Akiyoshi Nakao as Larry Butz / Masashi Yahari
 Ryo Ishibashi as Manfred von Karma / Gō Karuma
 Akira Emoto as The Judge
 Mitsuki Tanimura as Lotta Hart / Natsumi Ōsawagi
 Takehiro Hira as Gregory Edgeworth / Shin Mitsurugi
 Eisuke Sasai as Robert Hammond / Yukio Namakura
 Makoto Ayukawa as Redd White / Masaru Konaka
 Kimiko Yo as Misty Fey / Maiko Ayasato
 Fumiyo Kohinata as Yanni Yogi / Kōtarō Haine

Soundtrack
For the soundtrack, Endō chose to use various themes by Masakazu Sugimori from the original video game and re-arranged them for an ensemble consisting of a string orchestra, an oboe, a clarinet, two French horns, a trumpet, and a choir. Additional background music was also newly composed. The soundtrack was later released on CD to tie in with the movie. The film's theme song, "2012Spark", was composed and performed by the Japanese male rock group Porno Graffitti.

Release
The film made its world premiere at the International Film Festival Rotterdam on 27 January 2012 with a release in Japanese cinemas on 11 February 2012. The film made its US premiere at the Hawaii International Film Festival in April 2012. The film was released on DVD and Blu-ray on 22 August 2012 in Japan, and on 17 April 2013 in Australia. In Germany, the film was released by Koch Media on DVD and Blu-ray on 14 June 2013.

Reception
The movie earned over $1,547,000 in its opening weekend at the Japanese box office, where it grossed  during its theatrical run.

The film received generally favorable reviews from critics. Richard Eisenbeis of Kotaku praised the film, calling it "the best video game movie ever", which was also echoed by fellow Kotaku writer Matt Hawkins. Paul Verhoeven of IGN scored it 8 out of 10, calling it a great "pitch-perfect adaptation of the game." Ard Vijn of Screen Anarchy said he "loved it and so did most of the audience" at the International Film Festival Rotterdam. Megan Lehmann of The Hollywood Reporter called it a "cartoonishly fun legal drama". Travis Hopson of AXS described it as "the perfect example of an adaptation done right, capturing the frenetic and confusing storylines while remaining fresh and engaging enough for newcomers" and achieving "a certain level of greatness." Nintendo Life called it "the best video game movie out there." Matthew Razak of Destructoid described it as a good movie "that not only grabs the gamer's side of things but becomes a thing in and of itself, something rarely done by gaming movies." Brandon Harris of Indie Wire called it a stylish, "bizarre, oddly satisfying video game adaptation and otherworldly legal satire."

Jay Weissberg of Variety referred to the film as a "dull production" that was "criminally long and generally lacking in [Miike's] playful visual hyperbole." Wilma Jandoc of the Honolulu Star Advertiser lamented that the film could not easily translate the sillier aspects of the game into the movie, but contended that a viewer not privy to the video game series could be entertained if they focused on the more mystery/crime side of the movie and ignored the sillier parts.

See also
 List of films based on video games

References

External links

 Gyakuten Saiban profile on Capcom 
 

2010s mystery comedy-drama films
2012 films
2010s dystopian films
Films directed by Takashi Miike
Nippon TV films
2010s Japanese-language films
Japanese courtroom films
Japanese mystery comedy-drama films
Ace Attorney
Live-action films based on video games
Toho films
Films based on Capcom video games
2012 comedy films
2012 drama films
2010s Japanese films